Professor Hannah Lewi is an architectural historian and educator based in the Melbourne School of Design at the University of Melbourne.

Education and career 
Lewi was educated at the University of Western Australia, and worked at Curtin University before relocating to Melbourne. She has been a registered architect with the Australian Institute of Architects.

Lewi has been closely associated with the Society of Architectural Historians, Australia and New Zealand (SAHANZ). Between 2003 she co-edited Fabrications: Journal of the Society of Architectural Historians, Australia and New Zealand, alongside Julie Willis (2002–03) and later Deidre Brown (2003–05). In 2005 she was elected as the President for the Society of Architectural Historians, Australia and New Zealand, and served in this role between 2005-07. She has been Chair and is currently serving as Vice-Chair of DOCOMOMO Australia. She was historical advisor to the Australian exhibition and accompanying book The Pool, for the Venice Architecture Biennale, 2016.

With Paul Walker, Julie Willis and Philip Goad, Lewi is a co-director of the Australian Centre for Architectural History, Urban and Cultural Heritage (ACAHUCH).
She is renowned for her generosity towards other scholars and mentoring of new researchers.

Research and professional activities 
Lewi's research focuses on heritage and placemaking, Australian 20C architecture, with particular expertise in the history of Western Australian architecture. Her work in these fields has often experimented with and reflected upon new media including the design of history and heritage digital applications. She is the current vice-chair of DOCOMOMO Australia.

She has recently co-led an international research project titled Citizen Heritage, funded by the Australian Research Council. A major output has been the co-design and implementation of a digital platform for sharing stories and memories PastPort.

She is currently a co-lead investigator on a project titled Campus: Building Modern Australian Universities', funded by the Australian Research Council.
Campus Project Page

Lewi was an historical advisor and contributor to the Australian Architecture exhibition and book at the Venice Biennale in 2016 on 'The Pool', and has published many articles on the history of swimming pools in Australia.

 Selected publications 
 Lewi, Hannah. 'Paradoxes in the Conservation of Modernism' in Henket, and Heynen. Back from Utopia : The Challenge of the Modern Movement. Rotterdam: 010 Publishers, 2002.
Lewi, Hannah and Stephen Neille. ''Fading Events and Places : the Architecture of the VII British Empire & Commonwealth Games Village and Perry Lakes Stadium Perth, W.A: Dept. of Architecture, Curtin University of Technology, 2003.
Lewi, Hannah 'Designing a virtual museum of digital heritage’, in, New Heritage: new media and cultural heritage,  Y Kalay, T Kvan and J Affleck (eds), London: Routledge Press, 2007.
 Lewi, Hannah and David. Nichols. '[https://www.newsouthbooks.com.au/books/community_building-modern-australia/ 'Community : Building Modern Australia]. Sydney: UNSW Press, 2010.
 Lewi, Hannah and Wally Smith. "Hand-held Histories: Using Digital Archival Documents on Architectural Tours." Architectural Research Quarterly 15, no. 1 (2011): 69-77.
Lewi, Hannah ‘Back to School: understanding the evidential value of the modern documentary’, in The Journal of Architecture, Routledge, Vol 20:2, 193-214., 2015.
Lewi, Hannah and Cameron Logan, ‘A Stimulus for Education: Global Economic Events and the Design of Australian Schools’ in Economy and Architecture:, eds J Odgers, M McVikar, S Kite, (eds)  London: Routledge, 2015.   
Lewi Hannah, W Smith, A Murray and S Cooke, ‘Visitor, Contributor and Conversationalist: multiple digital identities of the heritage citizen’, Historic Environment Journal, special issue ‘Citizen Heritage’, Vol 28: No 2, 2016.
Lewi, Hannah and A Peckham ‘Transcribing The Journal of Architecture: research, representation and publication 2004–2013’, The Journal of Architecture, Routledge, 20th anniversary anthology, Vol 21: 4, 479-489, 2016.
 Lewi, Hannah and Andrew Saniga. "Carte Blanche on Campus?" Fabrications 27, no. 3 (2017): 322-51.
W Smith, H Lewi & D Nichols, 'PastPort: reflections on the design of a mobile application for local history sharing in Port Melbourne', Australian Historical Studies 49, no. 1, 2018.
Lewi, Hannah ‘A Return to the Production of Annotation’ in Production Sites: Resituating the Culture of Architectural Knowledge, S Psarra (ed), London: Routledge, 2019.
 Lewi, Hannah and Philip. Goad. Australia Modern : Architecture, Landscape & Design. Port Melbourne, Victoria: Thames & Hudson Australia Pty, 2019.
Lewi, Hannah and Wally Smith, Steve Cooke and Dirk vom Lehn. The Routledge International Handbook of New Digital Practices in Galleries, Libraries, Archives, Museums and Heritage Sites. Routledge in press 2019.

References 

Architectural historians
Australian women historians
Australian historians
Writers from Melbourne
Writers from Perth, Western Australia
University of Western Australia alumni
Academic staff of the University of Melbourne
Australian architecture writers
Australian women architects
Architecture educators
Australian feminists
Australian women academics
Architecture critics
Living people
Year of birth missing (living people)
University of Melbourne women